Markko Märtin (born 10 November 1975 in Tartu) is a retired rally driver from Estonia, who competed in the World Rally Championship from 2000 until 2005.

Career

Märtin, as understudy to then-team mates Colin McRae and Carlos Sainz, rose to prominence with the Ford World Rally Team in the 2002 season. He was leading that year's Acropolis Rally Greece until he suffered two punctures and fell behind the more experienced McRae. He won the equivalent event in Greece the following year as well as being only the third driver in the history of the WRC to break the Nordic stranglehold on the Neste Rally Finland. In addition to this, Märtin was inaugural winner, again with Ford, of the Corona Rally Mexico in the 2004 season. He also won the tarmac rallies of Corsica and Catalunya in the same year. These victories were the last for the Märtin/Michael Park partnership.

For 2005 Märtin departed the team for former constructors' champion Peugeot and its 307 car. He and co-driver Park had still notched up four podium finishes for their new employers by the time they had arrived in Wales to contest the Wales Rally Great Britain.  On the final leg of the event, two kilometres from the start of Stage 15 at Margam Park, Märtin's Peugeot crashed into a tree. Although the Estonian driver was left unhurt by the crash, co-driver Michael Park was immediately killed in the accident, the first fatality for a competitor at WRC-level for over a decade. As a result, Märtin announced that he would pull out of the last four events of the 2005 season.

Shaken by the death of Park, Märtin effectively left the WRC stage.  He went on to manage a junior rallying team in the Estonian rally scene, indicating that he would likely refuse any offers to drive at the top level again. He has since spoken out against the FIA's treatment of the WRC, claiming that the series had lost much of its lustre and calling for a far-reaching rules overhaul.

However, Märtin made a limited return to competitive rallying in March 2006 at the 2006 Rally of Portugal. The invitational event was held as a candidate for full WRC status. Märtin competed in a Subaru Impreza, his first outing in an FIA-spec Group N car in nearly a decade.  He was co-driven by David Senior, who formerly worked with Alister McRae. Märtin also partook in the 2006 Danish Touring Car Championship with Hans Hartmann's Honda Racing.

Märtin signed a deal to become the official test driver for the Subaru World Rally Team in 2008.  He has since test-driven for Ford and Mini.

Life after WRC
In 2009, Märtin was hired by Ford to work as a R&D factory driver. He helped to train WRC rookie Ken Block for the 2010 WRC season. On 7 June 2010, it was announced that Märtin would race in Rally Estonia, which took place on 16–18 July 2010 and which was also an IRC candidate event. Märtin drove a Ford Focus RS WRC 03, which he referred to as "the best rally car in the world."
Märtin won all twelve stages, second place, Ott Tänak lost 2.50,3.

Together with his father, Märtin runs a haulage company in Estonia. He also rents out land and property, most prominently a piece of land to Autospirit, an Estonian car dealership. In 2005 he also created MM Motorsport, which won several Estonian Rally Championship titles. The team also has numerous Ford Fiesta R5 for rent.

Personal life
Märtin lives in Monaco with Miss Model Estonia 2004 Mari-Liis Sallo and they welcomed their first child together in summer 2007.

Märtin also appeared in the 2019 documentary film Ott Tänak: The Movie as one of the interviewees.

Complete World Rally Championship results
(key)

WRC victories
{|class="wikitable"
! Number
! Event
! Season
! Co-driver
! Car
|-
| 1
|  50 th BP Ultimate Acropolis Rally of Greece
|rowspan=2 | 2003
|rowspan=5 | Michael Park
|rowspan=3 | Ford Focus RS WRC 03
|-
| 2
|  53rd Neste Rally Finland
|-
| 3
|  18º Corona Rally México
|rowspan=3 | 2004
|-
| 4
|  48ème Tour de Corse – Rallye de France
|rowspan=2 | Ford Focus RS WRC 04
|-
| 5
|  40º Rallye Catalunya-Costa Brava (Rallye de España)
|}

References

External links

Article on Märtin's intention to retire
Article on Märtin's joining with DTC
 Stats at Jonkka's World Rally Archive
 Stats at ewrc-results.com

1975 births
Living people
Sportspeople from Tartu
Estonian rally drivers
Danish Touring Car Championship drivers
World Rally Championship drivers
People from Monte Carlo
Expatriate sportspeople in Monaco
Estonian expatriates in Monaco
Motorsport team owners
Peugeot Sport drivers